Engelbert Haider (20 April 1922 – 12 November 1999) was an Austrian alpine skier. He competed in three events at the 1948 Winter Olympics.

References

1922 births
1999 deaths
Austrian male alpine skiers
Olympic alpine skiers of Austria
Alpine skiers at the 1948 Winter Olympics
Sportspeople from Tyrol (state)